Globicetus is an extinct genus of ziphiidae cetaceans, with one species, G. hiberus, from the Miocene of Portugal and Spain.
The holotype is a skull in the Museu da Lourinhã, in Portugal. G. hiberus is notable for having a large, spherical mass of bone on its rostrum.

References

Ziphiids
Prehistoric cetacean genera
Miocene cetaceans
Fossils of Portugal
Fossils of Spain
Fossil taxa described in 2013
Monotypic mammal genera